Nijolė Būraitė  (born 17 January 1956 in Druskininkai) is a Lithuanian painter/painting restorer.

In 1982 graduated from the Lithuanian Institute of Fine Arts . Since 1976 worked on restoring wall paintings.

See also
List of Lithuanian painters

References

Sources
'Nijolė Būraitė. Visuotinė lietuvių enciklopedija, T. III (Beketeriai-Chakasai). V.: Mokslo ir enciklopedijų leidybos institutas, 2003, 623 psl'
This article was initially translated from the Lithuanian Wikipedia.

Lithuanian painters
1956 births
Living people